Davy Crockett  is a 1916 American silent film starring Dustin Farnum as Davy Crockett, with Winifred Kingston, Harry De Vere, Herbert Standing, Howard Davies, Page Peters, Lydia Yeamans Titus and Ida Darling. The film was directed by William Desmond Taylor and produced by Pallas Pictures.

The film was commercially released in the United States and distributed by Paramount Pictures. It is not known whether the film currently survives, suggesting that it may be a lost film.

References

External links

 
 
 Davy Crockett at SilentEra

1916 films
1916 Western (genre) films
American black-and-white films
Davy Crockett
Silent American Western (genre) films
Films directed by William Desmond Taylor
1910s American films
1910s English-language films